Naz Baloch  is a Pakistani politician, member of the National Assembly of Pakistan. Member of Standing Committees Broadcast, Information, and Information Technology. She is the face of the electronic media in Pakistan, a key spokesperson of Pakistan People's Party. Naz Baloch belongs to Rind Baloch tribe, she joined Pakistan Tehreek-e-Insaf in 2011 as a young political activist, and within 2 years of her dynamic grassroots politics, she got elected as Central Vice President of Pakistan Tehreek-e-Insaf in May 2013 and became the member of Central Executive Committee. She contested General Elections 2013 from NA-240 Karachi, a difficult constituency for a woman to contest.
Her contributions in the 2014 PTI Dharna as a frontline young leader who managed the media with her tireless efforts made her more popular among the masses. 
In July 2017 Naz Baloch joined Pakistan People's Party. Her father Abdullah Baloch is a founding member PPP and Minister during Zulfiqar Ali Bhutto's tenure. She is also an active member of the International Visitors Leadership Program, USA.

Early life and education
She has bachelor's degree in Economics from St. Joseph's College. Her ethnically Baloch father, Abdullah Baloch, is a high-ranking member of Pakistan Peoples Party, Ex-Minister Zulfiqar Ali Bhutto tenure.

Political career
She joined PTI in August 2011. She contested general election from Karachi for national assembly Constituency NA-240 in May 2013 as a candidate of Pakistan Tehreek-e-Insaf.    After getting married on 22 April 2011 she joined PTI in August 2011, turning down the option of joining the family party PPP. She is the only woman in her family to have taken part in party politics, as it is uncommon for Baloch women to take part in public affairs. On 11 May 2013, she was the only women contestant in the constituency and was the runner-up, receiving 21,094 votes.

On 16 July 2017, Naz Baloch joined Pakistan Peoples Party leaving her party affiliation with Pakistan Tehreek-e-Insaf.

References

External links
"Meet the Baloch daughters of the east" (May 2013). Tribune.com.pk.
"Naz Baloch quits PTI, joins PPP" (16 July 2017).
A divided household: Daughter in PTI, father in PPP

Living people
Baloch people
Politicians from Karachi
Pakistan People's Party MNAs
Pakistani MNAs 2018–2023
1982 births